The seat of the European External Action Service (initially referred to as The Capital, and thereafter sometimes the Triangle building) is the office building on the Robert Schuman Roundabout in the heart of the European Quarter of Brussels, Belgium, in which most of the European External Action Service (EEAS) resides. The building also houses some other EU departments. The EEAS staff moved into the building in February 2012.

History

Previous buildings
Previously there were a number of architecturally diverse buildings on the property, collectively named JECL after the initials of the three surrounding streets: the Avenue de la Joyeuse Entrée, the Avenue de Cortenbergh and the Rue de la Loi.

Planning
When it was decided that the old JECL complex was to be demolished, the European Commission signalled its interest in purchasing the property in order to build a new EU conference centre on the site. The negotiations between Axa and the Commission were tough and lasted for more than five years, but eventually failed in 2006 due to disagreement over the price. Axa instead decided to built an ordinary office building.

Construction and inauguration

The main structure of the present triangular building was completed in 2009. Referred to as The Capital by Axa, the building was originally divided into 6 technically independent sections named after the capitals of the six founding member states of the European Union (EU): Rome, Paris, Berlin, Luxembourg, Amsterdam and Brussels, respectively. In the centre is a large circular courtyard which is heavily planted and, in 30 years from its construction, the architect insisted it will look "magnificent".

Axa intended to split the complex between the Commission, national embassies and private companies. However the Commission refused to share the building. Negotiations became drawn out but as of August 2010 the Commission and Axa were close to a signature for the whole building. In July 2010 European Personnel Selection Office (EPSO) entered one of the six parts of the buildings, occupying 9000m² out of a total of 54000m². It was later joined by the Foreign Policy Instruments Service (FPI) and the EEAS, whose staff had previously been dispersed across six buildings.

Tenants
The Commission is expected to lease 50,000 m² of the 60,000 m² block for at least 15 years at a cost of around €10 million a year. The new EEAS will fill most of the space, with some room left for assorted Commission departments. EPSO has in a separate contract already leased a 10,000 m² chunk from July 2010. The building is owned by the French insurance company AXA. Further space will be let to street-side shops. The EEAS lease will be €12 million-a-year, with the first year free (before moving in, the staff of the newly formed EEAS were housed in six separate buildings at a cost of €25 million a year. The EEAS will be inaugurated on 1 December 2010 in the lobby of the building.

The building also hosts the Foreign Policy Instruments Service, a minor department of the Commission.

See also 
 Kortenberg building, in which most Common Security and Defence Policy, including those of the EEAS, bodies are situated as the Triangle building was not deemed sufficiently secure in 2012
 European External Action Service
 Brussels and the European Union
 Institutional seats of the European Union

References

External links

Ashton set to take new office in EU nerve centre - EUobserver
listings-belgium.eur.cushwake.com, Cushman & Wakefield
L'Europe toise "The Capital" -La Libre Belgique 
Projects
hooox: Axa Real Estate

Buildings and structures in Brussels
Buildings of the European External Action Service
Office buildings completed in 2009
European quarter of Brussels
Triangular buildings